Ryan Ford (born 3 September 1978) is an English footballer who plays as a midfielder. Born in Worksop, Nottinghamshire, Ford began his career with Manchester United. When he failed to break into the first team, he was allowed to join Notts County in February 2000. Two years later, after just one league appearance for the Nottingham club, he moved to non-league Ilkeston Town, but left after only a year. In 2004, he joined Gainsborough Trinity, but again left a year later to join Retford United. He left Retford by mutual consent in February 2010 after failing to agree a new contract, but by September 2010, he was back with the club.

References

External links

1978 births
Living people
Footballers from Worksop
English footballers
Association football midfielders
Manchester United F.C. players
Notts County F.C. players
Ilkeston Town F.C. (1945) players
Gainsborough Trinity F.C. players
Retford United F.C. players